The 2021 ATP Salzburg Open was a professional tennis tournament played on outdoor clay courts. It was the first edition of the tournament which was part of the 2021 ATP Challenger Tour. It took place in Anif (Salzburg), Austria between 5 and 11 July 2021.

Singles main draw entrants

Seeds

 1 Rankings are as of 28 June 2021.

Other entrants
The following players received wildcards into the singles main draw:
  Jakob Aichhorn
  Peter Heller
  Maximilian Neuchrist

The following player received entry into the singles main draw using a protected ranking:
  Gerald Melzer

The following player received entry into the singles main draw as an alternate:
  Matteo Viola

The following players received entry from the qualifying draw:
  Alexander Erler
  Nicolás Jarry
  Jiří Lehečka
  Denis Yevseyev

The following player received entry as a lucky loser:
  Alexey Vatutin

Champions

Singles

  Facundo Bagnis def.  Federico Coria 6–4, 3–6, 6–2.

Doubles

  Facundo Bagnis /  Sergio Galdós def.  Robert Galloway /  Alex Lawson 6–0, 6–3.

References

ATP Salzburg Open
2021 in Austrian sport
July 2021 sports events in Austria